Spaneggsee is a lake in Filzbach, Glarus, Switzerland.

See also
List of mountain lakes of Switzerland

Lakes of Switzerland
Lakes of the canton of Glarus